Rock Iguana may refer to:

 The Rock Iguana, Iggy Pop, American punk rock singer and occasional actor
 Rock iguana (lizard) any species of the Genus Cyclura, that are found in the West Indies